This is a list of Algerian football transfers in the 2018–19 winter transfer window by club. clubs in the 2018–19 Algerian Ligue Professionnelle 1 are included.

Ligue Professionnelle 1

AS Ain M'lila
Manager:  

In:

Out:

CA Bordj Bou Arreridj
Manager:  

In:

Out:

CR Belouizdad
Manager:  

In:

Out:

CS Constantine
Manager:  

In:

Out:

DRB Tadjenanet
Manager:  

In:

Out:

ES Sétif
Manager:  

In:

Out:

JS Kabylie
Manager:  Franck Dumas

In:

Out:

JS Saoura
Manager:  

In:

Out:

MC Alger
Manager:  

In:

Out:

MC Oran
Manager:  

In:

Out:

MO Béjaïa
Manager:  

In:

Out:

NA Hussein Dey
Manager:  

In:

Out:

Paradou AC
Manager:  

In:

Out:

Olympique de Médéa
Manager:  

In:

Out:

USM Alger
Manager:  Thierry Froger

In:

Out:

USM Bel Abbès
Manager:  

In:

Out:

References

Algeria
Lists of Algerian football transfers
2018–19 in Algerian football